The antessive case (abbreviated ) is used for marking the spatial relation of preceding or being before. The case is found in some Dravidian languages.

References

Grammatical cases